The 2011 Women's African Nations Championship was the 15th edition of the Women's African Volleyball Championship organised by Africa's governing volleyball body, the Confédération Africaine de Volleyball. It was held in Nairobi, Kenya, from 17 to 24 August 2011. The winner qualifies for the 2011 FIVB World Cup, in November, in Japan.

Kenya won the championship defeating Algeria in the final and Egypt finished third defeating Senegal for the bronze medal.

Competing nations
The following national teams have confirmed participation:

Venue
 Nazarene University Sports Hall in Nairobi, Kenya.

Format
The tournament is played in two stages. In the first stage, the participants are divided in two groups. A single round-robin format is played within each group to determine the teams' group position (as per procedure below). The top four teams in each group advance to the second stage, only the fifth placed team does not and finish the tournament in last place.

In the second stage, the two best teams of each group progress to the semifinals, while the third and fourth placed teams from each group progress to the classification matches (for 5th to 8th place). The second stage of the tournament consists of a single-elimination.

Pool standing procedure
 Match points (win = 2 points, loss = 1 point)
 Number of matches won
 Sets ratio
 Points ratio

Pool composition
The drawing of lots was held in Nairobi, Kenya on 16 August.

Preliminary round

Group A

|}

|}

Group B

|}

|}

Knockout stage

5th–8th place bracket

Classification 5th–8th places

|}

Seventh place match

|}

Fifth place match

|}

Championship bracket

Semifinals

|}

Bronze medal match

|}

Final

|}

Final standing

Source: CAVB.

References
 Official CAVB results.

External links
 Results
 Official website

2011 Women
African Women's Volleyball Championship
African Women's Volleyball Championship
Women's African Volleyball Championship
International volleyball competitions hosted by Kenya